Saint George's Church, built in 1782 and painted by the Çetiri Brothers from Grabovë e Sipërme, is a cultural heritage monument in Strum, Fier County, Albania.

History and description
The two gates face north and west. The nave and apse were once covered in frescoes that have deteriorated, except for the western portion of the north wall where figures of five saints can be discerned. The Çetiri Brothers of Grabovë e Sipërme painted the art in 1782, most likely Joan whose work at St. George's in Fier is similar. The Greek inscription above the gate dates the church to April 1782.

The church was built of limestone from nearby quarries along with marble from ancient ruins, and Lime mortar and interior plaster were used to bind them. The iconostasis and other ceremonial objects are missing, but on the unpaved floor of the shrine near the apse are two remnants of ancient grooved columns and a marble fragment of a capital built in the Doric order, likely harvested nearby in Dimale. The small chapel on the northeastern side is similarly dilapidated but includes two small apses where worshipers once lit candles.

References

Churches in Albania